Évariste Mabi Mulumba (born 22 April 1941) is a Congolese former politician. He was Minister of Finance of Zaire from October 1986 to January 1987. He served as the First State Commissioner of Zaire from 22 January 1987 to 7 March 1988.

References

Finance ministers of the Democratic Republic of the Congo
1941 births
Living people
Academic staff of the University of Kinshasa
21st-century Democratic Republic of the Congo people